Metopus murrayensis is a species of metopid first found in soil from the Murray River floodplain, Australia, after which it is named. It can be distinguished by having a globular macronucleus surrounded by many refractive granules and a big preoral dome.

References

Intramacronucleata
Protists described in 2016